Awoniyi is a Yoruba surname. Notable people with the surname include:

 Taiwo Awoniyi (born 1997), Nigerian footballer
 Sunday Awoniyi (1932–2007), Nigerian politician and tribal aristocrat

Yoruba-language surnames